West Ottawa High School is located in Ottawa County, Michigan. Along with Holland High School, Holland Christian High School and Black River Public School, West Ottawa is one of four high schools in the Holland, Michigan area. Due to the large student body at the school (about 2,500 students), a new section of the high school was constructed and completed in 2005, and the high school campus now consists of two buildings approximately 500 yards apart. In February 2022, Kristine Jernigan became the first female principal of West Ottawa.

Academics
West Ottawa offers Advanced Placement (AP) courses and an International Baccalaureate (IB) program.

Students also have the opportunity to participate in dual-enrollment programs with area colleges. Participating colleges include Davenport University, Grand Valley State University, Grand Rapids Community College, Hope College, and Kendall College of Art and Design.

Arts
In 2007, West Ottawa was awarded the Grammy Foundation Signature School. It is 1 out of 27 schools in the country to achieve this award, which requires a school to excel in all 3 music groups. West Ottawa was selected as a nationwide finalist in 2010.

Band and Orchestra
The West Ottawa Band and Orchestra program is divided into four bands (Symphony, Wind Symphony, and Concert) and three orchestras (Concert Orchestra, Symphony Orchestra, and Chamber Orchestra).

The West Ottawa Marching Panthers participate in the Michigan School Band & Orchestra Association (MSBOA) District 10 Marching Festival, the area Christmas Parade, Tulip Time Parades, and Memorial Day Parade.

In addition, West Ottawa High School holds the West Ottawa Percussion Ensemble. In 2007, and again in 2008, the ensemble was named best in the state, and given the opportunity to perform at the Michigan Youth Arts Festival at Western Michigan University.

Choir
Choirs include the Vocalaires, Men Of West Ottawa, West Ottawa Select Women's Ensemble, Bella Voce and Bel Canto.

Theatre
Each year, West Ottawa Theatre presents 3 productions: a large-scale fall musical, a large-scale winter or spring play, and a middle school musical. West Ottawa is Troupe 5081 in the International Thespian Society.

Athletics
The West Ottawa varsity baseball team won the 2003 MHSAA state championship.

The girls swimming team was the MHSAA Division 1 state champion in 2012.

Demographics 
The demographic breakdown of the 2,166 students enrolled in 2020-21 was:

 Male - 53.0%
 Female - 47.0%
 Native American - 0.3%
 Asian - 7.8%
 Black - 3.0%
 Hispanic - 37.2%
 Pacific Islander - 0.1%
 White - 46.9%
 Multiracial - 4.8%

In addition, 797 students (36.8%) were eligible for reduced-price or free lunch.

Notable people
Tony Annese - head football coach at Ferris State University.
Margo F. Jonker - former softball coach, now head coach at Central Michigan University.
Desmond Morgan - Linebacker at U of M.
Rob Renes - co-captain at U of M, semi-finalist for the Lombardi Award.
Matt Vanderbeek - former NFL player.

References

External links
West Ottawa High School website
West Ottawa Public Schools website

Public high schools in Michigan
Schools in Ottawa County, Michigan